Grover A. Giles (October 7, 1892 – November 26, 1974) was an American politician who served as the Attorney General of Utah from 1941 to 1949.

He died on November 26, 1974, in Salt Lake City, Utah at age 82.

References

1892 births
1974 deaths
Utah Attorneys General
Utah Democrats